In England and Wales, life imprisonment is a sentence that lasts until the death of the prisoner, although in most cases the prisoner will be eligible for early release after a minimum term set by the judge. In exceptional cases a judge may impose a "whole life order", meaning that the offender is never considered for parole, although they may still be released on compassionate grounds at the discretion of the Home Secretary. Whole life orders are usually imposed for aggravated murder, and can only be imposed where the offender was at least 21 years old at the time of the offence being committed.

Until 1957, the mandatory penalty for all adults convicted of murder was death by hanging. The Homicide Act of that year limited the circumstances in which murderers could be executed, mandating life imprisonment in all other cases. The death penalty for murder was suspended for five years by the 1965 Murder (Abolition of Death Penalty) Act and was abolished in 1969 (1973 in Northern Ireland) since which time murder has carried a mandatory sentence of life imprisonment.

The Criminal Justice Act 2003 introduced new mandatory life sentences and created a new kind of life sentence, called "imprisonment for public protection" which could be imposed even for offences which would otherwise carry a maximum sentence of ten years. The consequent unprecedented levels of prison overcrowding prompted sentencing reform, including stricter criteria for the imposition of such sentences and some restoration of judicial discretion, in the Criminal Justice and Immigration Act 2008. Imprisonment for public protection was abolished by the Legal Aid, Sentencing and Punishment of Offenders Act 2012, although some prisoners remain incarcerated under the former legislation.

Life imprisonment is applicable only to defendants aged 18 and over. Those aged under 18 are sentenced to detention at His Majesty's pleasure. Any convict sentenced to a life sentence can in principle be held in custody for their whole life.

History

When Parliament was considering abolition of the death penalty, there were many MPs who were against the reform, and the deal offered was that former capital offences would always inevitably merit a mandatory life sentence. Accordingly, life imprisonment replaced the death penalty as punishment for murderers, firstly for those whose sentences were commuted and later for those whose crimes were not "aggravated" within the meaning of the Homicide Act 1957.  To begin with, it was fairly common for those sentenced to life to be released in around ten to fifteen years. As time passed, it came to be thought that longer sentences should be imposed, especially in cases such as the Moors Murders, the Yorkshire Ripper and Dennis Nilsen.  The Home Secretary was empowered to make Whole Life Orders to ensure that particularly dangerous or heinous criminals served their life sentences without the possibility of parole. As of 2006, mandatory lifers served an average of 14 years and for other lifers the average stood at nine years.

Criminal Justice Act 2003

Formerly, the Home Secretary reserved the right to set the "tariff" or minimum length of term for prisoners sentenced to life imprisonment. However, in November 2000, politicians were stripped of this power in relation to defendants aged under 18, following an appeal to the European Court of Human Rights by the murderers of James Bulger.

In November 2002, a similar decision in relation to adult offenders followed a successful challenge by convicted double murderer Anthony Anderson. Anderson had been sentenced to life imprisonment in 1988 with a recommended minimum term of 15 years, but the Home Secretary later informed him that he would have to serve at least 20 years. The House of Lords ruled that this was incompatible with his human rights.

This judgment was upheld by the European Court of Human Rights. Since then, judges have set minimum terms and only the Court of Appeal or the Supreme Court of the United Kingdom can make any amendments to the sentence. Though politicians can no longer decide when or if a life sentence prisoner can be considered for parole, the Attorney General still has the power to petition the Court of Appeal in a bid to increase any prison terms which are seen as unduly lenient. This power can only be exercised within 28 days of the sentence and that limit cannot be extended under any circumstances.

The Criminal Justice Act 2003 sets out guidelines for how long murderers should spend in prison before being considered for parole. Judges are not obliged to follow the guidelines, but must give reasons in court if they depart from them – whether recommending a lesser or higher minimum term than in accordance with the guidelines.

The guidelines recommended that multiple murderers (who murder two or more people) whose crimes involved sexual abuse, pre-planning, abduction or terrorism should never be released from prison. Such a sentence is known as a "whole life order". The murder of a single child following abduction, sexual or sadistic conduct also qualifies, as does the murder of a police or prison officer during the course of their duty (since 2015) and murder committed to advance a political, religious or ideological cause – along with any murder which was committed by someone who had previously been convicted of murder. Other multiple murders (two or more) should carry a recommended minimum of 30 years as a starting point sentence prior to consideration of additional aggravating factors and of any mitigating factors.

A 30-year minimum should also apply to the worst single murders, including those with sexual or racial motives and the use of a firearm – until 2015, the murder of a police officer in the course of duty also came within this category. Most other murders should be subject to a 15-year minimum as a starting point. There have been numerous departures from these guidelines since they were first put into practice. For example, the judge who sentenced American fugitive David Bieber for the murder of a police officer said that he should never be released from prison, whereas statutory guidelines recommended a 30-year minimum for this type of murder – this was a decade before the act was amended to include the murder of a police officer in the course of duty as one of the offenders whose life sentences should mean life.

On 23 July 2008, David Bieber won a High Court appeal against the whole life tariff recommended by the trial judge, and was instead issued with a minimum term of 37 years, effectively meaning that he would not be released until at least 2041, by which time he would be 75 years old if still alive. In the case of Mark Goldstraw, who killed four people in an arson attack on a house in Staffordshire in 2006, the trial judge set a recommended minimum of 35 years; this crime met the guidelines for a whole life term as it involved planning and resulted in the death of more than one person.

Many life prisoners have received minimum terms which, due to their length or the fact that the killer was middle aged or elderly when convicted, make it highly likely that they will never be released.

Paroles

A prisoner who has served their minimum term becomes eligible for parole. If the Parole Board agrees to release a prisoner who was sentenced to life, they are released on a life licence meaning that they will remain on parole for the remainder of their natural life. Prisoners who break the conditions of their release, or who are found to be a danger to the public, can be immediately returned to prison for an indefinite period under the terms of this licence.

In England and Wales, the average life sentence prisoners serve are around 15 to 20 years before being paroled, although those convicted of exceptionally grave crimes remain behind bars for considerably longer; Ian Huntley was given a minimum term of 40 years. Some receive whole life sentences which make it almost certain that they will die in prison; they can only be considered for release on appeal to the High Court, or in exceptional circumstances such as great age or ill health.

By 2015, there were at least 60 prisoners  in England and Wales serving such sentences, issued by either the High Court or the Home Office.  A number of prisoners have died in prison when serving such sentences including "The Yorkshire Ripper" Peter Sutcliffe, Moors Murderers (Ian Brady and Myra Hindley) and serial killer GP Harold Shipman who committed suicide four years into his sentence.

For England and Wales, the law regarding release on licence of prisoners is laid out in chapter 2 of the Crime (Sentences) Act 1997 (see in particular sections 28–30). This Act was amended and updated by the Criminal Justice Act 2003 chapters 6 and 7.

For Scotland, the law is set out in the Prisoners and Criminal Proceedings (Scotland) Act 1993, as amended in relation to life prisoners by the Convention Rights (Compliance) (Scotland) Act 2001, which incorporated changes to ensure that the procedure is compliant with the European Convention on Human Rights. The Scottish legal system does not allow a whole life sentence to be issued, but retains other forms of indefinite imprisonment, such as an Order for Lifelong Restriction.

Minimum term

Under the criminal law of England and Wales, a minimum term (formerly "tariff") is the minimum period that a person serving an indefinite sentence must serve before that person becomes eligible for parole. The sentencing judge bears responsibility for setting the minimum term.

The purpose of this mechanism has been described as follows:

The factors involved in the determination of a tariff were contested in the 1993 case of Robert Thompson and Jon Venables, two 11-year-old boys who were convicted of the murder of two-year-old James Bulger. Although the trial judge initially recommended that the pair would have to serve at least eight years in custody, the High Court later set a minimum term of 10 years. However, in July 1994 the Home Secretary Michael Howard set a tariff of 15 years, based in part on the public outcry over the murders. The ruling also came shortly after The Sun newspaper petitioned the Home Secretary with the signatures of thousands of readers for the two killers to receive stiffer sentences.

In June 1997, the House of Lords ruled that Howard had acted unlawfully when setting the 15-year minimum terms. This ruling also signalled the end of the Home Secretary's powers to set minimum terms for offenders who committed their crimes before the age of 18.

In November 2002, following a European Court of Human Rights ruling that the Home Secretary could no longer set minimum terms for life sentence prisoners, the High Court stripped the Home Secretary of his powers to set minimum terms completely. Earlier that year, following a legal challenge by another convicted murderer, Dennis Stafford, the Home Secretary had also been stripped of his powers to overrule the Parole Board's recommendations that a life sentence prisoner should be granted parole.

Another notable prisoner whose minimum sentence was increased was Myra Hindley, jailed for life in 1966 for her role in the Moors Murders; she was convicted of murdering two children and being an accessory in the murder of a third. Her partner Ian Brady was convicted of all three murders. Their trial judge later recommended to the appropriate authorities that he felt it was unlikely that Brady could ever be rehabilitated and safe to be considered for release, but felt that the same was not true of Hindley once she was removed from Brady's influence, recommending that she should be considered for parole after a period of around 25 years. This ruling was endorsed by at least one Home Secretary and High Court judge, but after the pair confessed to two more murders in 1986, Hindley's minimum term was increased to 30 years and then replaced by a whole life tariff in 1990, although she was not informed of the decision until 1994 - following a High Court ruling that the Home Secretary was obliged to inform all life sentence prisoners when or if they could be considered for parole. This was despite reports by Parole Board and prison officials which stated that Hindley should be considered for parole or at least for a transfer to an open prison as a possible prelude to parole in the near future.

Lord Longford and David Astor, two high-profile supporters of Hindley, backed her campaign for parole, and claimed that a succession of Home Secretaries were keeping her in prison in an attempt to win votes for their respective governments, as well as shying away from an inevitable tabloid media backlash that would accompany lost votes for any government whose Home Secretary failed to block Hindley's release from prison. Some sources also claimed that Hindley was being kept in prison for her own safety more than to protect the public from any risk she might pose, as she had received numerous deaths threats from relatives of the Moors Murders victims and from members of the public pledging to kill her if she was ever set free. Hindley lodged three appeals against her whole life tariff, but all three appeals were unsuccessful and she remained in prison until her death in November 2002, just over a week before the Home Secretary was stripped of his powers to set minimum terms for life sentence prisoners.

With the death of Myra Hindley, the Home Secretary had lost perhaps the most high-profile prisoner in the prison system, whose minimum term had been increased by a succession of Home Secretaries, leaving him with limited time to select new high-profile prisoners to impose heavy sentences on. Some of these factors were used as grounds to appeal in June 2010 when one of the killers, Roy Whiting, successfully appealed to have his sentence reduced in the High Court.

A similar system operates in Scotland, whereby the trial judge fixes a "punishment part" to "satisfy the requirements of retribution and deterrence". The prisoner cannot be considered for parole until this punishment part is served.

For example, for a murder, someone may be given a life sentence with a minimum term of 15 years. This means they cannot be released on parole until the minimum term is served. Some prisoners serve considerably longer than the minimum term recommended by the trial judge – even if it was later reaffirmed or reduced by a Home Secretary or by the High Court. A notable example is Harry Roberts, jailed for life in 1966 for his role in the murder of three policemen in London. His trial judge recommended that he serve at least 30 years before being considered for parole, but he was not granted parole until 2014, by which time he had served 48 years in prison.

Starting points for murder
The terms below are only guidelines for adults, and starting points vary in different legal cases. Starting points may either be increased or decreased depending on aggravating and/or mitigating factors respectively. The guidelines are currently in Schedule 21 of the Sentencing (Pre-consolidation Amendments) Act 2020.

However, the law still states that life sentence prisoners (and prisoners issued with fixed-term prison sentences) who have been convicted of crimes committed before the Criminal Justice Act 2003 came into force (18 December 2003) are sentenced according to guidelines which existed when the crime was committed.

Whole life order 

The whole life order (formerly a whole life tariff) is a court order whereby a prisoner who is being sentenced to life imprisonment is ordered to serve that sentence without any possibility of parole or conditional release. This order may be made in cases of aggravated murders committed by anyone who was aged 21 or above at the time of the crime; or where the offender was aged between 18 and 20 if the Court considers that the seriousness of the offence, or combination of offences, is exceptionally high even by the standard of offences which would normally result in a whole life order where the offender is aged 21 or over. The purpose of a whole life order is for a prisoner to spend the rest of their life in prison, although they may still be released on compassionate grounds (see compassionate release) or pardoned by the monarch, within the royal prerogative of mercy. It is the most serious criminal penalty that can be imposed for any crime in the United Kingdom.

Section 30(1) of the Crime (Sentences) Act 1997 provides that the Home Secretary may at any time release a life prisoner on licence if satisfied that exceptional circumstances exist which justify the prisoner’s release on compassionate grounds. A prisoner can then be released early when criteria such as great age, injury, disability or ill health are met; this has seen several life sentence prisoners being granted early release a considerable length of time before the date when they could first apply for parole. A whole life order can also be quashed on appeal by the Court of Appeal; a number of prisoners have had their sentences reduced by this method. From 1983, the Home Secretary had the right to decide how long a life sentence prisoner should serve before being considered for parole, and the trial judge was not obliged to recommend when or if an offender should be considered for parole. In some cases, the trial judge had recommended that a life sentence prisoner should at some point be considered for parole, only for the Home Secretary to later impose a whole life order.

The question of whether a Home Secretary or any of the other appropriate authorities should have the power to impose whole life orders was a controversial one, since a decision to impose such a sanction (or not) could carry political consequences for the Home Secretary and, by extension, the government they served – as well as a backlash by the national media. Perhaps the most notable example is Myra Hindley, sentenced to life in prison in 1966 for her role in the Moors Murders. Her trial judge recommended that she should serve a minimum of 25 years before being considered for parole. However, this was later increased to 30 years and in 1990 to "whole life" by David Waddington. Supporters of her campaign for parole argued that she was being kept in prison to serve the interest of successive Home Secretaries and their respective governments. She died in November 2002, having never managed to win parole; on three occasions she had appealed against the Home Office's ruling that she should never be released, but each of these appeals failed.

The introduction of the government's tariff-setting procedures in 1983 also came shortly after a number of murderers were convicted of widely reported crimes. Also in 1983, Dennis Nilsen was jailed for life for murdering 11 young men whose dismembered bodies were found at the two flats he had rented in North London. Two years earlier, "Yorkshire Ripper" Peter Sutcliffe had been found guilty of murdering 13 women and attacking seven others in a six-year spree. Nilsen and Sutcliffe remained in prison until their deaths in 2018 and 2020 respectively.

In 1976, Donald "Black Panther" Neilson was convicted on four charges of murder at the end of a highly publicised trial. All of these murderers were also subjected to a whole life order by subsequent Home Secretaries. Like Nilsen and Sutcliffe, Neilson remained in prison until his death, dying in 2011 after serving 35 years of his life sentence.

In November 2002, a successful legal challenge by convicted double murderer Anthony Anderson saw the Home Secretary stripped of the final say on how long a life sentence prisoner must serve before parole can be considered, including the right to decide that certain prisoners should never be released. This ruling had been anticipated for several months, and was delivered just days after the death of Myra Hindley, who had been widely expected to gain immediate parole in the event of the Home Secretary being stripped of these sentencing powers.

A year later, the Criminal Justice Act 2003 was passed, which required that the trial judge recommend the minimum number of years to be served (or order that life should mean life) in the case of anyone being sentenced to life imprisonment. As had been the case when the Home Secretary could determine when or if a life sentence prisoner could be considered for parole, prisoners were entitled to have their sentence reviewed by the High Court. These prisoners can also appeal to the European Court of Human Rights if their appeals to the High Court are unsuccessful.

In June 1997, the High Court had already stripped the Home Secretary of the power to decide on minimum terms for life sentence prisoners who were convicted before the age of 18, following a legal challenge by solicitors acting for Robert Thompson and Jon Venables. The pair had been found guilty of murdering Merseyside toddler James Bulger in 1993, when they were 11 years old. The trial judge's initial recommendation was that they should not be considered for parole for at least eight years. The Lord Chief Justice later ruled that the pair should serve a minimum sentence of 10 years, but following a petition by The Sun newspaper, Home Secretary Michael Howard had ruled during 1994 that the pair should not be released until they had spent at least 15 years in custody.

Only the Home Secretary can grant a release to a prisoner sentenced to a whole life order, on compassionate grounds including great age or ill health. Only four prisoners known or believed to have been issued with a whole life order have so far been released from their sentences. Three of them were IRA members who were freed under the Good Friday Agreement in 1999, having spent more than 20 years in prison for terrorist offences including murder. The other was gang member Reggie Kray, who was freed from his life sentence in August 2000 after serving 32 years (two years after the expiry of his original 30-year minimum term) due to terminal cancer; although the Home Office never confirmed that he had been issued with a whole life order, his lengthy imprisonment and the fact that he was not paroled when his tariff expired (despite being well into his sixties) helped fuel media speculation that he was among the prisoners who had been issued with a whole life order. He died a few weeks after being freed.

Many prisoners have also received minimum sentences which are likely to last for most if not all of their remaining lives, such as child killers Roy Whiting and Ian Huntley, who were both convicted of child murder and received 40-year minimum terms which mean that they cannot apply for parole until they are at least 82 and 68 respectively. Whiting's trial judge had originally recommended that life should mean life and just before the High Court stripped politicians of their sentencing powers in November 2002, Home Secretary David Blunkett set Whiting's minimum term at 50 years, which was effectively a whole life order as it meant that he could only apply for parole if he lived to be at least 92. This decision was later appealed before the High Court, and the order was reduced to a 40-year minimum term. Huntley murdered two 10-year-old girls in August 2002, but by the time he was convicted 16 months later, the Home Secretary had been stripped of powers to set minimum terms for life sentence prisoners, and that decision was instead left to the High Court.

Between 1997 and 2000, Hindley made three appeals against the ruling that life should mean life in her case, but each was unsuccessful. She remained in prison until her death in November 2002, 36 years after she was sentenced. Her campaign for parole was supported by Lord Longford and David Astor, who claimed that she was a reformed character who had merely acted as Ian Brady's accomplice under duress, and had completely changed once removed from his influence. However, opinion polls showed that the majority of the British public was opposed to Hindley being paroled, and the tabloid media largely opposed her release as well. Hindley received numerous death threats from members of the public – including the relatives of some of the Moors Murders victims – who vowed to kill her if she were ever released from prison. Widespread public and media doubt as to whether Hindley's remorse was genuine was further fueled by the fact that Hindley did not confess to two more murders until 1986, and further strengthened the belief of those who opposed her attempts to win parole that the reported turnaround in her life while in prison was nothing more than a ploy to boost her chances of parole.

Ian Brady, who committed the Moors murders with Myra Hindley, was also told by a succession of Home Secretaries that his life sentence should mean life, but unlike Hindley he never attempted to gain parole, and insisted he never wanted to be released from custody. In 1999, he made an unsuccessful legal challenge to be allowed to starve himself to death. He died in May 2017 after more than 50 years in prison, and was Britain's longest-serving prisoner.

Since 2003, the law has provided that whole life orders cannot be issued to anyone who was under the age of 21 at the time of their crime, although there had never been a previous case of a whole life order being imposed or recommended to someone who committed their crime before the age of 21.

Around 100 prisoners are believed to have been issued with whole life orders since the mechanism was first introduced in 1983, although some of them were convicted of their crimes before that date and some of the prisoners known to have been issued with the whole life order have since died in prison or had their sentences reduced on appeal.

A number of prisoners who are unlikely to ever be released or have received very long sentences have declared their wish to die; for example, Ian Brady. At least two such inmates have died by suicide in prison, Harold Shipman and Daniel Gonzalez, and there have been attempted suicides by such prisoners, including Ian Huntley. A number have died in prison as a result of ill health, including Brady's accomplice Myra Hindley and the "Black Panther" serial murderer and armed robber Donald Neilson.

Whole life sentences have also been criticised in some quarters for giving offenders no incentive to behave well and co-operate with prison staff, or make any serious attempt at rehabilitation. An example of this was highlighted by the case of Robert Maudsley, sentenced to life for a single murder in 1975, who went on to kill three inmates several years into his sentence.

European Court of Human Rights challenges against whole life orders
Three convicted murderers, Jeremy Bamber, Peter Moore and Douglas Vinter, all murderers who had been sentenced to whole life orders, applied to the European Court of Human Rights in Strasbourg, for the court to declare that it is a contravention of the European Convention on Human Rights for someone to be sentenced to lifelong imprisonment. When the initial ruling was delivered in January 2012, the court ruled that because the whole-life orders were imposed by a judge only after consideration of the facts of each case, and because the life prisoners could apply to the Home Secretary for compassionate release, their whole life orders did not breach their human rights.

A later appeal by the same men led to a ruling in July 2013 that there must be a prospect of review of whole life orders within 25 years of the prisoner being sentenced, and that any impossibility of parole would violate their Article 3 rights. By this stage there were at least 49 prisoners serving such sentences in England and Wales.

In February 2014, five judges at the Court of Appeal found the Strasbourg court was incorrect in concluding English and Welsh law never allowed whole life orders to be reduced because the Secretary of State could reduce such orders in "exceptional circumstances", and that all "whole life" prisoners would be entitled to a review of their sentence within 25 years of being sentenced. The whole life order in the United Kingdom is therefore in fact not really life imprisonment without parole, but it is close to it. Lord Chief Justice Lord Thomas said whole life orders were compatible with the European Convention on Human Rights (ECHR) in the most appalling cases of murder. Thomas said further, "Judges should therefore continue as they have done to impose whole-life orders in those rare and exceptional cases. ... In our judgment the law of England and Wales therefore does provide to an offender 'hope' or the 'possibility' of release in exceptional circumstances which render the just punishment originally imposed no longer justifiable." According to a barrister Edward Fitzgerald, whole-life prisoners since 2014 "are in a sort of limbo. In legal theory they have the right to a review after say 25 or 30 years in the light of their progress. But in actual practice there is no recognition of this fact in any policy statement by the Secretary for Justice and no real means of knowing what it is they must do to win release even after decades in custody".

In February 2015, the ECHR upheld the lawfulness of whole life orders, on the ground that they can be reviewed in exceptional circumstances, following a fresh challenge by murderer Arthur Hutchinson, who had been sentenced to life imprisonment for a triple murder in Sheffield more than 30 years earlier. Another legal challenge to the court by Hutchinson was rejected in January 2017. By this stage, there were believed to be more than 70 prisoners in England and Wales serving whole life sentences.

References
 .

External links
 Schedule 21 of the Criminal Justice Act 2003, from legislation.gov.uk
 Life Sentenced Prisoners in United Kingdom from Ministry of Justice
 Information from Liberty website regarding United Kingdom

Imprisonment and detention
England and Wales
English criminal law
English legal terminology
Sentencing (law)